St Issey and St Tudy was an electoral division of Cornwall in the United Kingdom which returned one member to sit on Cornwall Council between 2013 and 2021. It was abolished at the 2021 local elections, being succeeded by Padstow, Wadebridge West and St Mabyn and St Teath and Tintagel.

Councillors

Extent
St Issey and St Tudy represented the villages of Little Petherick, St Issey, St Mabyn, St Tudy and St Breock, as well as the hamlets of Engollan, St Eval, Rumford, Highlanes, Trevance, Tredinnick, St Jidgey, Trevorrick, Tregonce, Edmonton, Burlawn, Washaway, Longstone and St Ervan. Parts of Porthcothan (shared with Padstow division) and Ruthernbridge (shared with Lanivet and Blisland) were also covered. The division covered 11,822 hectares in total.

Election results

2017 election

2013 election

References

Electoral divisions of Cornwall Council